The Henry Ladd and Gretchen Hoyt Corbett House is a Colonial Revival-style house in Dunthorpe, Oregon, an unincorporated suburb of Portland. It is listed on the National Register of Historic Places.

The property on which the house sits was part of an 1850 640-acre land claim by William S. and Mary Jane Torrance. A 19-acre portion of the property, located in Dunthorpe which was then known as Rivera, was acquired in 1904 by Henry Ladd Corbett, a prominent politician and businessman who twice served as President of the Oregon State Senate.

The house was built in 1915 and 1916 by Corbett, who had married Gretchen Hoyt in 1908. It was a large two-story home with 7,000 square feet (650 m2) of interior space. In addition to the family living areas, there was a two-story servants' wing connected to the main house.

Henry Corbett continued to reside in the house until his death in 1957, and Gretchen until her death in 1978. The property was divided into several lots, including a 1.6 acre lot around the house, which was listed on the NRHP in 1991. Houses have since been built on most of the other lots.

References

1885 establishments in Oregon
Houses completed in 1916
Houses on the National Register of Historic Places in Oregon
Colonial Revival architecture in Oregon